Marcus Deen (born 5 August 1973) is a Dutch former figure skater.

Results

External links
results

1973 births
Living people
Dutch male single skaters
People from Zoetermeer
Sportspeople from South Holland